Arun Shankar Prasad is an Indian politician from Bharatiya Janata Party, Bihar and a two term Member of Bihar Legislative Assembly from Khajauli Assembly constituency.

References 

1960 births
Living people
Bihar MLAs 2020–2025
Bharatiya Janata Party politicians from Bihar
Bihar MLAs 2010–2015